The women's tournament of the water polo at the 2022 South American Games was held from 11 to 15 October 2022 at the Centro Acuático Nacional in Asunción, Paraguay. It was the second edition of the water polo women's tournament at the South American Games since its first appearance in Medellín 2010 (it was not held in Santiago 2014 and ended being cancelled in Cochabamba 2018).

The tournament served as qualifier for the 2023 Pan American Games, with the top two teams qualifying to the women's water polo tournament.

Defending champions Brazil won the gold medal and their second South American Games women's water polo title after beating Argentina by a 14–8 score in the final. Both teams, Brazil and Argentina, qualified for the 2023 Pan American Games as the CONSANAT representatives, besides Chile who qualified automatically as hosts.

Peru beat Venezuela 18–17 (4–3 on penalties) to win the bronze medal.

Schedule
The tournament was held over a 5-day period, from 11 to 15 October.

Teams
A total of seven ODESUR NOCs entered teams for the women's tournament.

Rosters

Each participating NOC had to enter a roster of 13 players, including at least 2 goalkeepers (Technical manual Article 10.2).

Results
All match times are in PYST (UTC−3).

Group stage
The group stage consisted of two groups; one of three teams and another of four teams. Each group was played under the round-robin format with the top two teams of each group progressing to the semi-finals and the third placed team of each group advancing to the fifth place match.

Group A

Group B

Knockout stage
The knockout stage consisted of the fifth place match (between the third placed team of each group in the group stage), the semi-finals and the bronze and gold-medal matches. The semi-finals match-ups were:

Semifinal 1: Group A winners v Group B runners-up
Semifinal 2: Group B winners v Group A runners-up

Winners of semi-finals played the gold-medal match, while losers played the bronze-medal match.

Semifinals

Fifth place match

Bronze-medal match

Gold-medal match

Final ranking

Medalists

Qualified teams for Pan American Games
The following three teams from CONSANAT qualified for the 2023 Pan American Games women's water polo tournament, including Chile which qualified as hosts.

1 Bold indicates champions for that year. Italic indicates hosts for that year.

References

External links
 ASU2022 Water polo Teams Female at ASU2022 official website.

Water polo at the 2022 South American Games
2022 in women's water polo